Marcia (c. 29before 100) was an ancient Roman noblewoman and the mother of the emperor Trajan.

Family
Marcia came from a noble and politically influential family, the plebeian gens Marcia, which claimed to be descended from the Roman King Ancus Marcius. Marcia was a daughter of the Roman Senator Quintus Marcius Barea Sura and wife Antonia Furnilla. Quintus Marcius Barea Sura was a friend to future Roman Emperor Vespasian. Her younger sister Marcia Furnilla was the second wife of future Roman Emperor Titus. Marcia was a maternal aunt to Furnilla's and Titus' daughter Flavia.
 
Marcia's paternal uncle was the Roman Senator Quintus Marcius Barea Soranus, while her paternal cousin was the noble woman Marcia Servilia Sorana. Marcia's paternal grandfather was Quintus Marcius Barea, who was Suffect Consul in 34 and Proconsul of the Africa Province in 41–43, while her maternal grandfather could have been Aulus Antonius Rufus, a Suffect Consul either in 45. The family of Marcia was connected to the opponents of Roman Emperor Nero. In 65 after the failure of the Pisonian conspiracy, her family was disfavored by Nero.

Life
Marcia was born and raised in Rome. During the reign of Roman Emperor Claudius (41-54), Marcia married a Spanish Roman general and senator called Marcus Ulpius Traianus. Traianus originally came from Italica (near modern Seville, Spain) in the Roman Province of Hispania Baetica. After Marcia married Traianus, for a time they lived in Italica.

Marcia bore Traianus two children:
 A daughter - Ulpia Marciana (48-112/114), who inherited her second name from her mother's paternal ancestry. Marciana married Gaius Salonius Matidius Patruinus, who was a wealthy senator and became Praetor. Marciana bore Patruinus a daughter called Salonia Matidia, who was born in 68.
 A son - Marcus Ulpius Traianus, or known as Trajan (53-117). Trajan became and served as a Roman Emperor from 98 until his death in 117. He married a woman called Pompeia Plotina.

Marcia owned clay-bearing estates called the Figlinae Marcianae, which was located in North Italy. When Marcia died, Trajan inherited these estates from his mother. It is unknown if Marcia lived long enough to see Trajan become Emperor.

Legacy
Around 100, her son Trajan founded a colony in North Africa which was called Colonia Marciana Ulpia Traiana Thamugadi (modern Timgad, Algeria). Her son named this town in honor of her, her late husband and her daughter. The colony's name is also a tribute in honoring her family.

References

Sources
 The Trial of P. Egnatius Celer on JSTOR
 Roman Emperors - DIR Trajan
 Roman Emperors DIR Roman legions
 
 
 WebCite query result
The Cambridge Ancient History

1st-century Roman women
Nerva–Antonine dynasty
Marcii
20s births
1st-century deaths
Year of birth uncertain
Year of death uncertain